Gary Lucchesi (born January 4, 1955 in San Francisco, California) is an American film producer who is President of Lakeshore Entertainment and past President of The Producers Guild of America.

Career
Lucchesi began his career at The William Morris Agency as an agent, representing such artists as Susan Sarandon, Kevin Costner, Michelle Pfeiffer and John Malkovich. Lucchesi served as both Vice President and Senior Vice President of Production at TriStar Pictures before becoming President of Production at Paramount Pictures. Following his time at Paramount, Lucchesi founded Gary Lucchesi Productions, where he produced the Oscar nominated film Primal Fear. Lucchesi was also President of Andrew Lloyd Webber's Really Useful Film Co., producing the film version of the hit musical Cats. In 1997, he was asked by Tom Rosenberg to run Lakeshore.

Lucchesi graduated from Sacred Heart Cathedral Preparatory in San Francisco in 1973 before attending UCLA. He graduated with a degree in history in 1977.

Filmography
He was a producer in all films unless otherwise noted.

Film

Thanks

Television

References

External links

1955 births
Film producers from California
American film studio executives
Living people
Businesspeople from San Francisco
University of California, Los Angeles alumni